Musée des Beaux-arts et de la Dentelle d'Alençon (In English: Museum of Fine Arts and Lace of Alençon) is an art museum located in Alençon, France.

See also
 List of Jesuit sites

References

External links
 
 La dentelle d’Alençon, un point c’est tout! 

1857 establishments in France
Museums established in 1857
Art museums and galleries in France
Decorative arts museums in France
Museums in Orne
Textile museums
Lace